Tablada Nueva is a neighbourhood (barrio) of Asunción, Paraguay. 

Neighbourhoods of Asunción